Julia Scott is a noted Canadian-American writer and journalist, known primarily for her work in print and broadcast media. She is a contributor to both The New York Times and The New York Times Magazine, as well as National Public Radio, American Public Media, Salon, Canadian Geographic and Maclean's. "Bon Voyage", her 2012 radio documentary for the BBC World Service, was praised by The Guardian as "a vivid, beautifully told story of a couple facing terminal illness" and broadcast internationally, winning the Excellence in Journalism Award from the NLGJA and becoming a finalist for the Radio Academy Award. Her audio documentary "Under One Roof" aired on CBC's "The Current" on April 16, 2020.

Scott is also the editor of the anthology Drivel: Deliciously Bad Writing by Your Favorite Authors (Perigee Books, 2014), cited as "classic" by Vanity Fair and featuring contributions by Dave Eggers, Gillian Flynn, Mary Roach, Rick Moody and Chuck Palahniuk, among others. She is the subject of "Julia", an episode in the Heavyweight podcast series by Jonathan Goldstein, named "One of the 10 Best Podcast Episodes of 2016" by Elle magazine.

A native of Montreal, Scott maintains dual Canadian and American citizenship. She currently resides in Oakland, California.

Honors
 Notable Selection, The Best American Essays (2019 edition), 2020 
 Finalist, Radio Academy Award, 2013
 Excellence in Journalism Award, NLGJA, 2013
 Special Citation, Knight Risser Prize for Western Environmental Journalism, 2011
 The Best American Science Writing (for "Pesticides Indicted in Bee Deaths"), 2010 
 Scripps Howard Fellowship for Environmental Studies, 2008 
 Metcalf Institute for Environmental Reporting Fellowship, 2008

See also
Investigative journalism

References

External links
 Official website
 Center for Investigative Reporting: California Watch profile
 Metcalfe Institute for Marine & Environmental Reporting profile
 New York Times interview with Julia Scott, May 22, 2014

Living people
American women journalists
Canadian women journalists
Journalists from Montreal
Writers from Montreal
Writers from the San Francisco Bay Area
Canadian women non-fiction writers
Year of birth missing (living people)
21st-century American women